Moses Francis Masika Wetang'ula (born 13 September 1956), is the current Speaker of the National Assembly of Kenya, as well as leader of the FORD-Kenya party. He served in the government of Kenya as Minister for Foreign Affairs from 2008 to 2010 and from 2011 to 2012, and he was Minister for Trade from 2012 to 2013.

Early life and education
Wetangula went to Nalondo Primary School, Busakala secondary school, Teremi Secondary School, and Friends School Kamusinga before being admitted to the University of Nairobi, where he graduated with a Bachelor of Laws (LLB) degree. He was a member of the Board of Directors of ICROSS Kenya from 1989, stepping down when he became Kenya's Minister for Foreign Affairs.

Political career

He was nominated as a Kanu MP after the 1992 general election, serving until 1997. He has held several other previous public positions which include that of the magistrate and the chairman Electricity Regulatory Board. Wetangula actively participated in organisation of funds-drives to set up projects on self-help basis and has been offering legal services to the local people. He has mobilised women and the youth to initiate income generating projects.

Wetangula was elected to the National Assembly in the December 2002 parliamentary election, and has never lost all the election he has participated ever since. He was appointed into the cabinet by President Mwai Kibaki on 8 January 2008,amid a crisis regarding the results of the concurrent presidential election, Wetangula was named Minister for Foreign Affairs. Later in January, in reaction to criticism from the United Kingdom regarding the presidential election, Wetangula summoned the United Kingdom's High Commissioner, Adam Wood, to complain, and he said that "our elections don't need a stamp of authority from the House of Commons". After a power-sharing agreement was reached between Kibaki and Raila Odinga, both of whom claimed victory in the presidential election, Wetangula retained his post in the Grand Coalition Cabinet named on 13 April 2008.

In March 2012, Wetangula was stranded in Bamako, Mali during a coup d'état. He was evacuated after being trapped in his hotel room for several days.

Shortly after Wetangula's return, Kibaki shuffled his cabinet. Wetangula left his post as Foreign Minister and became the Trade Minister.

He was elected to the Senate of Kenya in 2013, representing Bungoma County, and became Minority Leader in the Senate of Kenya. He was later replaced in the position of Minority Leader by the then Senator of Siaya County James Orengo. This is because Raila Odinga was unhappy with the fact that his fellow luo was not in that position and therefore instructed that Orengo should replace Wetangula. 16 ODM senators signed a petition to oust him out as the minority leader. Wetangula warned them, "If anyone wants a divorce, it would be messy, it would be noisy, it would be unhelpful, it would not be easy, it would have casualties", he said. Raila Odinga became a casualty after losing the presidential contest in 2022 general election, as Wetang'ula made Dr William Ruto the fifth President of Kenya. In the run-up to the August 2022 Kenyan general election, Wetang'ula and his party Ford Kenya joined forces with other parties to form the Kenya Kwanza Alliance, where he became a co-principal. Wetang'ula was re-elected with a landslide win as Bungoma senator in the August 2022 Kenyan general election, but he resigned shortly afterwards to vie for the position of the Speaker of the National Assembly of Kenya, hence becoming the third in line of succession in the Republic of Kenya. On 8 September 2022, Wetangula defeated his only competitor, former speaker Marende to become the speaker of the 13th Parliament of Kenya.

Tokyo embassy scandal

Wetangula left his ministerial post on 27 October 2010 due to ongoing investigation on his alleged involvement in the Kenyan Tokyo embassy scandal. It was alleged that instead of accepting free property from the government of Japan for the embassy, 1.6 billion shillings was withheld from the sale of Kenyan property in Nigeria and used to buy a less suitable property.George Saitoti served as acting foreign minister during Wetangula's absence.

Wetangula was later absolved of the allegations and any wrongdoing by five separate probes and returned to the ministry in August 2011, though he permanently left the position a few months later to successfully contest for the position of Senator for Bungoma County.

Senate Minority Leader
After winning election to the Senate, Wetangula was selected to serve as Minority Leader of the Senate of Kenya representing the Coalition for Reforms and Democracy. The Bungoma High Court nullified his election on 30 September 2013 and the Speaker of the Senate declared the seat vacant on 16 October 2013.
In a by-election held on 19 December 2013, Ford Kenya candidate Moses Wetangula recaptured his Bungoma senatorial seat with a landslide win after garnering 149,458 votes against his main contender Musikari Kombo, who got about a half of the votes.
 
Kombo, who was vying on a New Ford Kenya ticket, came second with 81,016 votes followed by independent candidate David Makali and Labour Party of Kenya candidate Bifwoli Wakoli at a distant third and fourth place respectively.

Makali secured 2,155 votes while Wakoli garnered 1,899 votes from a total of 942 polling stations, with a 57 percent voter turnout.

On 20 March 2018, Wetangula was replaced by Siaya senator James Orengo as Senate Minority leader.

Speaker of The National Assembly 
Wetangula retained his Bungoma senate seat in the August 2022 Kenyan general election, winning by a landslide. However, he resigned shortly after from that position in order to vie for the position of the Speaker of the National Assembly of Kenya. On 8 September 2022, he contested successfully to become the speaker of the 13th Parliament of Kenya after defeating his only competitor Kenneth Marende. Wetangula had garnered a total of 215 votes against Marende's 130 votes, while he did not attain the requisite 2/3's of the votes cast in order to win in the first round, he was nevertheless elected as speaker since his only competitor Marende withdrew from the repeat election. Wetangula took over from Justin Muturi and became the 8th Speaker of the National Assembly of Kenya.

Personal life
Wetangula's father Mzee Dominic Wetangula is a retired teacher in Nalondo, Bungoma County and lives in the village together with his wives. The Wetangula's family is a political family with his younger brother Timothy Wanyonyi Wetangula being the MP for Westlands Constituency in Nairobi County. His other siblings include Fred Wetangula a Nairobi-based businessman and the Late Tony Waswa Wetangula. He also has a younger sister Emmeryncian Naswa.

Moses Wetangula has several wives. The first wife is called Phyllis Wetangula but he does not live with her.
Wetangula's Children include his son Fidel Wetangula, Daughter Sheila Wetangula and Tamara Wetangula. He also has other children with his other wives.

References

External links
Office of Public Communications
Ministry of Foreign Affairs

1956 births
Kenyan Luhya people
Living people
Members of the Senate of Kenya
Members of the National Assembly (Kenya)
Kenya African National Union politicians
Alumni of Friends School Kamusinga
Party of National Unity (Kenya) politicians
Foreign ministers of Kenya
Trade ministers of Kenya
Leaders of political parties in Kenya
Speakers of the National Assembly of Kenya